There have been seven baronetcies created for members of the Lowther family, one in the Baronetage of Nova Scotia, two in the Baronetage of England, two in the Baronetage of Great Britain and two in the Baronetage of the United Kingdom. Two of the creations are extant as of 2008.

The Lowther baronetcy, of Lowther in the County of Westmorland, was created in the Baronetage of Nova Scotia in circa 1638 for John Lowther, of Lowther Hall, Westmorland. For more information on this creation, which became extinct in 1802, see Earl of Lonsdale.

The Lowther baronetcy, of Whitehaven in the County of Cumberland, was created in the Baronetage of England on 11 June 1642 for Christopher Lowther. He was the younger brother of the first Baronet of Lowther. He was succeeded by his son, the second Baronet. He sat as Member of Parliament for Cumberland. After his death the title passed to his elder son, the third Baronet. He was disinherited by his father. He was succeeded by his younger brother, the fourth Baronet. He was a distinguished industrialist and politician. Lowther never married and on his death in 1755 the baronetcy became extinct. He left his vast estates to his cousin Sir William Lowther, 3rd Baronet, of Marske (see below), and following his death to the Lowther branch (see Earl of Lonsdale).

The Lowther baronetcy, of Marske in the County of York, was created in the Baronetage of England on 15 June 1697 for the twenty-one-year-old William Lowther, subsequently Member of Parliament for Cumberland. He was the grandson of Robert Lowther, brother of Sir John Lowther, father of the first Baronet of Lowther and of the first Baronet of Whitehaven. He was succeeded by his son, the second Baronet. He also represented Lancaster in the House of Commons. On his death the title passed to his son, the third Baronet. He served as Lord-Lieutenant of Westmorland. In 1755 he succeeded to the vast estates of his cousin Sir James Lowther, 4th Baronet, of Whitehaven (see above). However, Lowther died unmarried at an early age the following year when the baronetcy became extinct.

The Lowther baronetcy, of Swillington in the County of York, was created in the Baronetage of Great Britain on 6 January 1715 for William Lowther, Member of Parliament for Pontefract. He was the grandson of Sir William Lowther, brother of the first Baronet of Lowther and the first Baronet of Whitehaven (see above) and the uncle of the first Baronet of Little Preston (see below). He was succeeded by his elder son, the second Baronet. He was also Member of Parliament for Pontefract. On his death in 1763 the baronetcy became extinct. John Lowther, younger son of the first Baronet, was Governor of Surat.

The Lowther baronetcy, of Little Preston in the County of York, was created in the Baronetage of Great Britain on 22 August 1764 for Reverend William Lowther. He was the great-grandson of Sir William Lowther, brother of the first Baronet of Lowther and the first Baronet of Whitehaven, and the nephew of the first Baronet of Swillington. He was succeeded by his eldest son, the second Baronet. In 1802 he succeeded his third cousin once removed James Lowther, 1st Earl of Lonsdale (a great-grandson of the first Baronet of Lowther – see Earl of Lonsdale), as second Viscount Lowther according to a special remainder in the letters patent. In 1807 the earldom of Lonsdale was revived in his favour. See Earl of Lonsdale for further history of the titles.

The Lowther baronetcy, of Swillington in the County of York, was created in the Baronetage of the United Kingdom on 3 November 1824 for John Lowther. He was the second son of the first Baronet of Little Preston and brother of William Lowther, 1st Earl of Lonsdale (1807). His seat was Wilton Castle. The second Baronet sat as a Member of Parliament. The present holder of the baronetcy is also in remainder to the Baronetcy of Little Preston and in special remainder to the barony and viscountcy of Lowther, titles held by his kinsman the Earl of Lonsdale.

The Lowther baronetcy, of Belgrave Square in the County of London, was created in the Baronetage of the United Kingdom on 19 January 1914 for the diplomat Gerard Lowther. He was the second son of William Lowther, second son of Henry Lowther, second son of the first Earl of Lonsdale of the second creation. James Lowther, 1st Viscount Ullswater (see Viscount Ullswater), and Sir Cecil Lowther, were his brothers. Lowther had three daughters but no sons and on his death in 1916 the baronetcy became extinct.

Lowther baronets, of Lowther (c. 1638)
see Earl of Lonsdale

Lowther baronets, of Whitehaven (1642)
Sir Christopher Lowther, 1st Baronet (died 1644)
Sir John Lowther, 2nd Baronet (1643–1706)
Sir Christopher Lowther, 3rd Baronet (1666–1731)
Sir James Lowther, 4th Baronet (1673–1755)

Lowther baronets, of Marske (1697)
Sir William Lowther, 1st Baronet (1670–1705)
Sir Thomas Lowther, 2nd Baronet (died 1715)
Sir William Lowther, 3rd Baronet (1727–1756)

Lowther baronets, of Swillington (1715)
Sir William Lowther, 1st Baronet (1663–1729)
Sir William Lowther, 2nd Baronet (died 1763)

Lowther baronets, of Little Preston (1764)
Sir William Lowther, 1st Baronet (1707–1788)
Sir William Lowther, 2nd Baronet (1757–1844) (succeeded as Viscount Lowther in 1802 and created Earl of Lonsdale in 1807)
for later holders, see Earl of Lonsdale

Lowther baronets, of Swillington (1824)

Sir John Lowther, 1st Baronet (1759–1844)
Sir John Henry Lowther, 2nd Baronet (1793–1868)
Sir Charles Hugh Lowther, 3rd Baronet (1803–1894).
Sir Charles Bingham Lowther, CB, DSO, 4th Baronet (1880–1949)
Sir William Guy Lowther, OBE, 5th Baronet (1912–1982)
Sir Charles Douglas Lowther, 6th Baronet (1946–2018)
Sir Patrick William Lowther, 7th Baronet (born 1977), educated at Radley College followed by Durham University (BA Politics, 1999) and Cass Business School (MA Real Estate, 2004), currently serving as Head of Investment at Assura plc

The heir apparent is the present holder's son Hugo Charles Sandy Lowther (born 2008).

Lowther baronets, of Belgrave Square (1914)
Sir Gerard Augustus Lowther, 1st Baronet (1858–1916)

See also
Earl of Lonsdale
Viscount Ullswater
Lowther family

Notes

References
Kidd, Charles, Williamson, David (editors). Debrett's Peerage and Baronetage (1990 edition). New York: St Martin's Press, 1990, 

Lowther pedigree 1
Lowther pedigree 2

Baronetcies in the Baronetage of Great Britain
Baronetcies in the Baronetage of the United Kingdom
Extinct baronetcies in the Baronetage of Nova Scotia
Extinct baronetcies in the Baronetage of England
Extinct baronetcies in the Baronetage of Great Britain
Extinct baronetcies in the Baronetage of the United Kingdom
1638 establishments in Nova Scotia
1642 establishments in England
1715 establishments in Great Britain
1824 establishments in the United Kingdom
Lowther family